Duckenfield, Jamaica is a village in St Thomas, in south-east Jamaica. It is named after the sugar plantation on which it is located. It is a very poor community, but it has grown substantially in recent years. There were plans to build an international airport in the vicinity in order to open the eastern end of the island to tourism, but these have since been shelved.

The economy of Duckenfield is dominated by the nearby sugar estate and factory which are the only major employers in the vicinity. Any change in the fortunes of the sugar industry has an immediate and dramatic effect. The St. Thomas Parish sugar mill Golden Grove closed in July 2019.

Climate

Amenities
There are two primary schools, Duckenfield Primary and Dalvey Primary.  a hospital and a post office.

See also
List of cities and towns in Jamaica

External links
Photos:

References

Populated places in Saint Thomas Parish, Jamaica